Pape Demba Diop (born 4 September 2003) is a Senegalese professional footballer who plays as a midfielder for Belgian Pro League club  Zulte Waregem.

Club career
Diop signed for Belgian side Zulte Waregem in September 2022, but would have to wait until October of the same year before he could train with his new side, due to work permit issues.

International career
Diop was called up to the Senegalese under-20 side for the 2023 Africa U-20 Cup of Nations. He scored in Senegal's 3–0 win over Mozambique, which sent Senegal through to the knockout stage.

Career statistics

Club

Notes

Honours 
Senegal U20

 U-20 Africa Cup of Nations: 2023
 U-20 West B Zone Tournament: 2022

Individual

 U-20 Africa Cup of Nations Golden Boot: 2023

References

2003 births
Living people
Senegalese footballers
Senegal youth international footballers
Association football midfielders
Senegal Premier League players
Belgian Pro League players
Diambars FC players
S.V. Zulte Waregem players
Senegalese expatriate footballers
Senegalese expatriate sportspeople in Belgium
Expatriate footballers in Belgium